This is a list of notable bombings related to the Northern Ireland "Troubles" and their aftermath. It includes bombings that took place in Northern Ireland, the Republic of Ireland, and Great Britain since 1968. There were at least 10,000 bomb attacks during the conflict (1968–1998).

1969
 5 August - RTÉ Studio bombing: The Ulster Volunteer Force (UVF) detonated a bomb at Raidió Teilifís Éireann (RTÉ) headquarters in Donnybrook, Dublin, Republic of Ireland, causing significant damage.

1970
 11 August – 1970 Crossmaglen bombing: Two Royal Ulster Constabulary (RUC) officers were killed by a booby-trap car bomb exploded in Crossmaglen, County Armagh. They were the first RUC victims of the IRA.

1971
 23 May – The IRA exploded a bomb in the Mountainview Tavern on the Shankill Road in Belfast. 18 people were injured.
 1 September – The IRA exploded a number of bombs across Belfast and Derry, injuring about two dozen people.
 2 September – The IRA detonated a bomb at the headquarters of the Ulster Unionist Party (UUP), which wrecked the building and injured some people.
 20 September – The IRA exploded a bomb in the Bluebell Bar in the loyalist Sandy Row area, injuring 27 people.
 29 September – Two Protestant civilians were killed when the Four Step Inn on Shankill Road, Belfast, was bombed. No group claimed credit for the bombing, but it is believed the IRA was behind it.
 9 October – The UVF detonated a bomb in the Fiddler's House Bar on Falls Road, Belfast. They had hoped to kill a Catholic but killed a 45-year-old Protestant woman instead.
 2 November – Red Lion Pub bombing: Three Protestant civilians were killed and dozens injured by an IRA bomb attack on a Protestant bar on Ormeau Road, Belfast.
4 December – McGurk's Bar bombing: There were 15 civilians killed and 17 injured by a UVF bomb attack on a Catholic bar in Belfast.
11 December – 1971 Balmoral Furniture Company bombing: Three Protestant civilians—two of them children—and a Roman Catholic civilian were killed. 19 people were injured in the attack. No group claimed credit for the attack but it was believed to have been carried out by the IRA.

1972
22 February – Aldershot bombing: Seven people were killed by an Official IRA bomb at Aldershot Barracks in England, thought to be in retaliation for Bloody Sunday. Six of those killed were female ancillary workers and the seventh was a Roman Catholic military chaplain.
4 March – Abercorn Restaurant bombing: A bomb exploded without warning in the Abercorn restaurant on Castle Lane, Belfast. Two were killed and another 130 were injured.
23 March – Donegall Street bombing: The IRA detonated a massive car bomb in Lower Donegall Street in Belfast's city centre. Seven people were killed in the explosion, including two members of the RUC. 148 people were injured.
21 July – Bloody Friday: The IRA exploded 35 bombs across Northern Ireland, and three large car bombs exploded in Derry, causing no injuries. The Belfast–Dublin train line was also bombed. The IRA detonated 22 bombs in Belfast's city center; nine people were killed (including two British soldiers and one Ulster Defence Association (UDA) member) from two bombs while 130 were injured.
31 July – Claudy bombing: Nine civilians were killed by a car bomb in Claudy, County Londonderry. No group has claimed responsibility, though the IRA was suspected.
22 August – Newry customs bombing: A bomb planted by the IRA detonated prematurely at a customs office in Newry. Three IRA members killed six civilians and themselves in the explosion.
14 September – Imperial Hotel bombing 1972: The UVF detonated a car bomb outside a hotel near Antrim Road, Belfast, which killed three people and injured 50 others. 91-year-old Martha Smilie, a Protestant civilian, was the oldest person killed during the Troubles.
31 October – Benny's Bar bombing: The UDA exploded a bomb outside a pub in Belfast, killing two Catholic children and injuring 12 people.
1 December – 1972 and 1973 Dublin bombings: Two civilians were killed and 127 were injured by two Ulster loyalist car bombs in Dublin, Republic of Ireland.
28 December – Belturbet bombing. loyalist paramilitaries exploded a bomb in Belturbet, County Cavan, Republic of Ireland, which killed two teenagers and injured 8 other people, at the same time a bomb exploded in Clones, County Monaghan, injuring two other people.

1973
January-June: 48,000lbs of gelignite explosives originating from the Republic of Ireland were detonated in Northern Ireland in the first six months of 1973 alone.
8 March – 1973 Old Bailey bombing: A civilian died from the Old Bailey courthouse bombing in London; over 200 were injured, and a simultaneous explosion happened at the Ministry of Agriculture in Westminster. On the same day as the London bombings, 11 bombs exploded in Northern Ireland: five bombs exploded in Belfast, which included a bomb at the Merville Inn pub; five other bombs exploded in Derry in less than an hour. The first bomb exploded at Ebrington Barracks, and another detonated beside the RUC Waterside station. Another bomb exploded in Lurgan, County Armagh. Only one person was injured in the attacks.
12 June – 1973 Coleraine bombings. Six Protestant civilians were killed by an IRA bomb in Coleraine, County Londonderry. The warning given prior to the explosion was inadequate.
10 September – King's Cross station and Euston station bombings: 13 people were injured when the IRA exploded two bombs at railway stations in Central London.
18 December – 1973 Westminster bombing: A car bomb exploded on Thorney Street near Millbank in the City of Westminster, London, injuring 60 people.

1974
4 February – M62 coach bombing: 12 people were killed by an IRA bomb planted on a coach on the M62 in the West Riding of Yorkshire carrying British soldiers and their families.
2 May - Rose & Crown Bar bombing - Six Catholic civilians were killed and 18 injured by a UVF bomb at a bar on Ormeau Road, Belfast.
17 May – Dublin and Monaghan bombings: the UVF detonated four bombs (three in Dublin, one in Monaghan) in the Republic of Ireland. They killed 33 civilians including a pregnant woman.
17 June – 1974 Houses of Parliament bombing: The IRA bombed the Houses of Parliament in London, injuring 11 people and causing extensive damage.
17 July – 1974 Tower of London bombing: The IRA detonated a bomb at the Tower of London, killing a civilian and injuring 41 people.
5 October – Guildford pub bombings: four soldiers and one civilian were killed and 65 people injured by IRA bombs at two pubs in Guildford, England.
22 October – Brooks's Club bombing: The IRA threw a bomb into a conservative club in London, injuring three staff members.
7 November – A soldier and a civilian were killed and 35 people injured when the IRA threw a bomb into the Kings Arms public house in Woolwich
21 November – Birmingham pub bombings: 21 civilians were killed and 182 injured by IRA bombs at pubs in Birmingham, England.
25 & 27 November – 1974 London pillar box bombings: The IRA exploded several bombs over a two-day period, injuring 40 people in total.
17 December – Telephone Exchange bombings: The IRA exploded three time bombs in west London at the telephone exchange, killing one civilian and injuring six others.
18 December – 1974 Bristol bombing: The IRA detonated two bombs in Bristol, injuring 20 people.
19 December – 1974 Oxford Street bombing: The IRA detonated a 100 lb. car bomb outside a Selfridges store on Oxford Street, injuring 9 people and causing over £1.5 million in damages. 
22 December – The IRA announced a Christmas ceasefire after carrying out a bomb attack on the home of former prime minister Edward Heath. Heath was not in the building at the time and no one was injured.

1975
13 March – 1975 Conway's Bar attack: A UVF member blew himself up along with a Catholic civilian woman while attempting to plant a bomb in a Belfast pub.
16 March – Mildred Harrison, a Protestant, was the first RUC woman to be murdered on duty by an explosion from a UVF bomb while on foot patrol passing Ormeau Arms Bar, High Street, Bangor, County Down.
5 April – Mountainview Tavern attack: A group calling itself the Republican Action Force bombed a pub in Belfast, killing four Protestant civilians and a UDA member, and injured 50 people.
12 April – Strand Bar bombing: The Red Hand Commando (a UVF-linked group) bombed a Belfast pub, killing six Catholic civilians and injuring 50 others.
27 August – Caterham Arms pub bombing: The IRA bombed a pub in Surrey, injuring 33 people.
5 September – A bomb was detonated in the lobby of London's Hilton Hotel, killing two and injuring 63 others.
9 October – 1975 Piccadilly bombing: The IRA bombed a tube station in London, killing a civilian and injuring 20 others.
29 October – Trattoria Fiore bombing: The IRA bombed a Mayfair restaurant, injuring 18 people.
12 November – Scott's Oyster Bar bombing: The IRA bombed a bar in London, killing one civilian and injuring 15 people.
18 November – Walton's Restaurant bombing: The IRA bombed a restaurant in Knightsbridge, killing two civilians and injured over 20.
29 November – Dublin Airport bombing: The UDA bombed Dublin Airport, killing a civilian staff member and injuring 10 people.
19 December – Donnelly's Bar and Kay's Tavern attacks: Bombings killed two civilians. The attack was linked to the Glenanne gang.
20 December – Biddy Mulligan's pub bombing: The UDA bombed a popular Irish pub in London, injuring five people.
31 December – Central Bar bombing: Members of the Irish National Liberation Army (INLA) using a cover name, Armagh People's Republican Army, bombed a pub in Portadown, killing three Protestant civilians and injuring 30 people.

1976
13 January – Two civilians and two bombers were killed in M and I Gallagher, North Street Arcade.
11 February – The Magherafelt police station was blown up by a 500 lb. bomb. There were zero deaths, minor injuries to service personnel and civilians living adjacent to the blast, and extensive damage.
4 March – Cannon Street train bombing: Eight people were injured when an IRA bomb exploded on a train.
7 March – Castleblayney bombing: The UVF detonated a car bomb in County Monaghan, killing a civilian and injuring 17 others.
17 March – Hillcrest Bar bombing: The UVF detonated a car bomb outside a pub in Tyrone, killing four people and injuring 50.
27 March – 1976 Olympia bombing: An IRA bomb exploded in London, killing one civilian and injuring 85 others in the blast. Due to the outrage over this bombing, the IRA temporarily suspended attacks in England.
15 May – Charlemont pub attacks: Five Catholic civilians were killed and many injured by two UVF bomb attacks in Belfast and Charlemont, County Armagh.
21 July – Christopher Ewart-Biggs, the British Ambassador to Ireland, and his secretary Judith Cook, were killed in Dublin by a bomb planted in Biggs's car.
16 August – 1976 Step Inn pub bombing: The UVF detonated a bomb in Keady, South Armagh, killing two civilians and injuring 20.
16 October – Garryhinch ambush: The IRA detonated a bomb at a farmhouse in Garryhinch, killing a member of the Garda and badly wounding four others.

1978
17 February – La Mon restaurant bombing: 12 civilians were killed and 30 injured by an IRA incendiary bomb at the La Mon Restaurant near Belfast.

1979
22 March – The IRA detonated 24 bombs in various locations across Northern Ireland. 22 of the bombs targeted banks. The biggest bomb was the 50 lb. bomb at Dungannon bank that demolished the bank building and damaged all the buildings in the same street.
30 March – Airey Neave, Conservative MP for Abingdon, was assassinated. A bomb exploded in his car as he left the Palace of Westminster in London. The INLA later claimed responsibility for the assassination.
17 April Four RUC officers were killed by an IRA van bomb in Bessbrook, County Armagh. The bomb was estimated at 1000 lbs., the largest IRA bomb used up to that point.
27 August – Warrenpoint ambush: 18 British soldiers were killed by an IRA bomb in Warrenpoint. A gun battle ensued between the IRA and the British Army, in which one civilian was killed. On the same day, four people (including the Queen's cousin Lord Louis Mountbatten) were killed by an IRA bomb on board a boat near the coast of County Sligo.
28 August – 1979 Brussels bombing: British Army bandsmen were targeted at the Grand-Place. The bombing injured seven bandsmen and eleven civilians.
16 December Four British soldiers were killed by an IRA landmine near Dungannon, County Tyrone. Another British soldier was killed by a Provisional IRA landmine near Forkhill, County Armagh.

1980
17 January – Dunmurry train bombing: An IRA bomb prematurely detonated on a passenger train near Belfast, killing three civilians and injuring five others.
7 March – an INLA active service unit planted two 10 lb. bombs at Netheravon British Army camp in Salisbury Plain. Only one bomb detonated and caused damage, started a fire, and injured two soldiers.
2 December – A device planted by the IRA exploded injuring five people at Kensington Regiment (Princess Louise's) Territorial Army Centre, Hammersmith Road, London.

1981

8 January – The IRA planted a bomb in the Suvla barrack block at RAF Uxbridge. 35 RAF musicians and 15 RAF airmen living there were evacuated before it exploded. The building was damaged badly by the blast and debris thrown across the Hillingdon Road, but no one was injured.
6 February – Attacks on shipping in Lough Foyle (1981–82): The IRA bombed and sank the British coal ship the Nellie M. An estimated £1 million was lost from the cargo.
27 April – The INLA killed RUC officer Gary Martin with a booby-trapped bomb hidden in a lorry at the junction of Shaw's Road and Glen Road, Andersonstown, Belfast.
19 May – Bessbrook landmine attack: The Provisional IRA South Armagh Brigade killed five British soldiers in a landmine attack at Bessbrook, Armagh.
10 October – Chelsea Barracks bombing: Two civilians were killed and over 20 British soldiers were injured in an IRA bombing outside the Chelsea Barracks.
17 October – Lieutenant-general Sir Steuart Pringle was injured in an explosion at his home in Dulwich, London, by a car bomb planted by the IRA. He lost a leg in the bombing.
26 October – The IRA bombed a Wimpy bar on Oxford Street, killing Kenneth Howorth, the Metropolitan Police explosives officer attempting to defuse it.
23 November – The IRA detonated a bomb which exploded at the Royal Artillery Barracks HQ. Two people were injured in the blast.
24 November: The INLA claimed responsibility for detonating a bomb outside the British Consulate in Hamburg, West Germany.
25 November: The INLA claimed responsibility for detonating a bomb at a British Army base in Herford, West Germany; one British soldier was injured.

1982
23 February – Attacks on shipping in Lough Foyle (1981–82): The IRA sank the St. Bedan, a British coal ship at Lough Foyle.
20 July – Hyde Park and Regents Park bombings: 11 British soldiers and seven military horses died in IRA bomb attacks in Regent's Park and Hyde Park, London. Many spectators were badly injured.
16 September – 1982 Divis Flats bombing: the INLA detonated a remote-control bomb hidden in a drainpipe as a British patrol passed Cullingtree Walk, Divis Flats, Belfast. Three people were killed: a British soldier, Kevin Waller; and two Catholic children, Stephen Bennett and Kevin Valliday. Three others, including two more British soldiers and a Catholic civilian, were injured in the attack. 
6 December – Droppin Well bombing: 11 British soldiers and six civilians were killed by an INLA bomb at the Droppin' Well Bar, County Londonderry.

1983
10 December – 1983 Royal Artillery Barracks bombing: A bomb exploded at the Royal Artillery Barracks in Woolwich, South East London. The explosion injured five people and caused minor damage to the building. The IRA claimed they carried out the attack.
13 July – Four UDR soldiers were killed by an IRA landmine in County Tyrone.
4 November – An INLA van bomb exploded outside the Fair bar on Patrick Street, Strabane. The explosion demolished the bar, injuring 29 people: 13 were seriously injured (including 3 RUC officers), and the other 16 people had minor injuries that did not require hospital attention.
17 December – Harrods bombing: an IRA car bomb killed three policemen and three civilians, and injured ninety outside a department store in London.

1984
9 May – A territorial Army reserve soldier died when the IRA booby-trapped their car. Two others in the car were seriously injured in the explosion.
18 May – Three British soldiers were killed by an IRA landmine in Enniskillen, County Fermanagh. Two RUC officers were killed by a Provisional IRA landmine near Camlough, County Armagh.
12 October – Brighton hotel bombing: the IRA carried out a bomb attack on the Grand Brighton Hotel, which was being used as a base for the Conservative Party Conference. Five people, including MP Anthony Berry, were killed. Margaret and Denis Thatcher were at the scene but unharmed.

1985
27 February – An INLA bomb destroyed a petrol station near Windsor Park. Earlier in the day the English football team played a match against Northern Ireland in the stadium and an INLA statement warned there would be further attacks on sporting events in the province.
28 February – 1985 Newry mortar attack: an IRA mortar attack on the Newry RUC station killed nine officers and injured thirty-seven.
20 April – The INLA claimed responsibility for firebombing a store in Dublin which sold South African goods in protest against the apartheid regime. There were no injuries as the building had been cleared following a telephone warning.
20 May – Four RUC officers were killed by an IRA bomb near Killeen, County Armagh.
9 August – A train travelling from Belfast to Dublin was severely damaged after the INLA planted four bombs in the carriages.
29 August – The INLA detonated a bomb on a train outside the Lanyon Place railway station, injuring seven RUC officers and two members of the train station's staff, and badly damaging a number of carriages. 
7 December – Attack on Ballygawley barracks: the IRA launched an assault on the RUC barracks in Ballygawley, County Tyrone. Two RUC officers were killed and the barracks was completely destroyed.

1986
11 August – Attack on RUC Birches barracks: The East Tyrone Brigade destroyed the RUC barracks at The Birches with a 200 lb. bomb driven in a JCB digger, near Portadown.

1987
8 November – Remembrance Day bombing: 11 civilians were killed and sixty-three injured by an IRA bomb during a Remembrance Day service in Enniskillen, County Fermanagh. One of those killed was Marie Wilson; in a BBC interview, her father Gordon (who was injured in the attack) expressed forgiveness towards his daughter's killer, and asked Loyalists not to seek revenge. He became a leading peace campaigner and was later elected to the Irish Senate. He died in 1995.

1988
15 June – Six off-duty British soldiers were killed by an IRA bomb on their minibus in Lisburn.
23 July – Robert James Hanna, his wife Maureen Patricia Hanna (both 44), and their son David (aged 7) were killed and 3 people were left injured in Killean, County Armagh after a 1,000 lb bomb exploded upon their Jeep Shogun passing by. The roadside bomb was thought to be intended for High Court Judge Eoin Higgins. The Provisional IRA issued a statement after the attack claiming responsibility, and going on to describe the Hannas as "Unfortunate victims of mistaken identity", adding that "This bomb, which was to be detonated by remote control, exploded prematurely, tragically killing three civilians."
1 August – Inglis Barracks bombing: A British soldier was killed and another nine injured when the IRA detonated a time bomb outside Inglis Barracks in Mill Hill, London.
20 August – Ballygawley bus bombing: eight British soldiers were killed and 28 wounded by an IRA roadside bomb near Ballygawley.

1989
20 February – Clive Barracks bombing: The Clive Barracks were bombed by the IRA. Only 2 people were injured in the attack but a fair amount of structural damage was done.
22 September – Deal barracks bombing: Eleven Royal Marines bandsmen were killed by the IRA at Deal Barracks in Kent, England.

1990
9 April – Four UDR soldiers were killed when the IRA detonated a bomb in a culvert under their patrol vehicle in Downpatrick, County Down.
25 June – Carlton Club bombing: A bomb exploded at the Carlton Club in London, injuring 20 people. Donald Kaberry died of his injuries on 13 March 1991.
20 July – The IRA bombed the London Stock Exchange.
30 July – Conservative MP Ian Gow was killed by a car bomb outside his house near Eastbourne.
6 September – RFA Fort Victoria bombing: The IRA planted two bombs aboard the Royal Fleet Auxiliary replenishment ship RFA Fort Victoria. One of them exploded, disabling the ship that had been constructed in Belfast and launched some weeks before. The second bomb failed to go off and was found and defused 15 days later. 
24 October – The IRA delivered three proxy bombs to British Army checkpoints. Three men (who were working with the British Army) were tied into cars loaded with explosives and ordered to drive to each checkpoint. Each bomb was remotely detonated. The first exploded at a checkpoint in Coshquin, killing the driver and five soldiers; the second exploded at a checkpoint in Killean, with the driver narrowly escaping and a soldier killed; and the third failed to detonate.

1991
3 February – The IRA launched a proxy bomb attack on a UDR base in Magherafelt, County Londonderry. The bomb caused major damage to the base and nearby houses, but the driver escaped before it exploded.
7 February – Downing Street mortar attack: The IRA launched a mortar attack on 10 Downing Street during a cabinet meeting with one mortar shell exploding in the garden, causing minor injuries to two people and two further shells landing nearby.
18 February – An IRA bomb detonated in a litter bin at Victoria Station, London, killing a man and injuring 38 other people. An earlier bomb at Paddington Station caused no casualties. These bombs influenced the removal of litter bins on station platforms.
31 May – Glenanne barracks bombing: The IRA launched a large truck bomb attack on a UDR barracks in County Armagh. Three soldiers were killed, while ten soldiers and four civilians were wounded.
9 June – The IRA detonated a large 600 lb car bomb in the Protestant village of Donaghcloney, damaging 40 homes. Four were completely destroyed, but the occupants were unharmed. The village was home to former Glenanne gang member and UVF leader Robin Jackson.
27–28 July – The UFF exploded seven incendiary devices in a number of shops in the Republic of Ireland. There were no injuries.
2 November – Two British soldiers were killed when the IRA detonated a bomb at Musgrave Park British Army hospital in Belfast. A two-storey building was destroyed by the blast.
15 November – An IRA bomb detonated in St Albans City Centre in Hertfordshire. Two fatalities, both members of the IRA (Patricia Black and Frankie Ryan), were the only casualties.
24 November – The IRA detonated an improvised explosive device in the loyalist wing of HM Prison Crumlin Road killing two loyalist prisoners, one from the Ulster Freedom Fighters (UFF) and one from the Ulster Volunteer Force (UVF).
14–15 December – Three firebombs exploded at the Brent Cross Shopping Centre in north-west London on the 14th, and another in the National Gallery on the 15th.
16 December – A trackside bomb near Clapham Junction railway station in south London, followed by hoax telephone warnings, disrupted travel in the city.

1992
17 January – Teebane bombing: A  ( per another source) roadside bomb detonated by the IRA destroyed a van and killed eight construction workers (one of them a Territorial Army soldier) on their way back from Lisanelly British Army barracks in Omagh, County Tyrone, where they were making repairs. Another eight were wounded.
10 April – Baltic Exchange bombing: A van loaded with one ton of home-made explosives went off outside the building of the Baltic Exchange company, at 30 St Mary Axe, London, killing three people and injuring another 91. The bomb caused £800 million worth of damage. Three hours later, a similar sized bomb exploded at the junction of the M1 and the North Circular Road at Staples Corner in north London, causing substantial damage but no injuries. Both bombs were placed in vans and were home-made rather than Semtex; each weighed several hundred pounds.
1 May – Attack on Cloghoge checkpoint: The IRA used a modified van that ran on railway tracks to launch an unconventional bomb attack on a British Army checkpoint in South Armagh. The checkpoint was obliterated when the 1,000 kg bomb exploded, killing one soldier and injuring 23.
12 May – 1992 Coalisland riots: After a small IRA bomb attack on a British Army patrol in the village of Cappagh, in which a paratrooper lost both legs, British soldiers raided two public houses and caused considerable damage in the nearby town of Coalisland. Five days later, the conflict became a fist-fight between soldiers and local inhabitants. Shortly thereafter, another group of British paratroopers arrived and fired on a crowd of civilians and injured seven. Two soldiers were hospitalized, communication equipment was shattered and a rifle and a GPMG were stolen.
18 June – 1992 Leeds bombing: The INLA planted nine devices in Leeds city centre. Only four of the devices exploded; the rest were either found and defused, or failed to go off. £50,000 of damage was incurred from the four devices that exploded.
19 September – Forensic Science Laboratory bombing: The IRA detonated a 3,700 lb bomb at the Northern Ireland forensic science laboratory in south Belfast. The laboratory was obliterated, 700 houses were damaged, and 20 people were injured. 490 owners and occupiers claimed damages.
13 October –  The IRA detonated a bomb at lunchtime in The Sussex Pub in Long Acre, Covent Garden, London. Five people were seriously injured.
21 October – The IRA detonated a 200 lb bomb, causing large amounts of damage to nearby buildings, in Main Street, Bangor, County Down.
13 November – The IRA detonated a large van bomb in Coleraine town centre. Extensive property damage was caused, resulting in several major buildings being demolished, but no casualties. Coleraine Town Hall required major structural work, and was not reopened until August 1995.
3 December – In Manchester, a car bomb was found behind Kendalls. Later that morning, after other threats of other bombs including the Arndale Centre, a bomb was detonated on Cateaton Street. 59 people were injured.
10 December – The UFF carried out seven firebomb attacks on shops in Dublin, Moville, and Buncrana in the Republic of Ireland.

1993
4 February – Two IRA bombs exploded in London: one at the South Kensington tube station and another on a Network Southeast train at the Kent House railway station in Beckenham. Bank and Monument stations in the City of London were also closed by telephoned bomb warnings.
7 March – The IRA detonated a 500 lb car bomb in Main Street, Bangor, County Down. Four RUC officers were injured in the explosion; the cost of the damage was later estimated at £2 million, as there was extensive damage to retail premises and Trinity Presbyterian Church, as well as minor damage to the local Church of Ireland Parish Church and First Bangor Presbyterian Church.
20 March – Warrington bombings: after a telephoned warning, the IRA detonated two bombs in Cheshire, England. Two children were killed and 56 people were wounded. There were widespread protests in Britain and the Republic of Ireland following the deaths.
24 April – 1993 Bishopsgate bombing: After a telephoned warning, the IRA detonated a large bomb in Bishopsgate, London. It killed one civilian, wounded 30 others, and caused an estimated £350 million in damage.
3 July – a  IRA van bomb was detonated outside Strabane courthouse, causing extensive damage.
 6 July – A large IRA bomb said to contain 1,500 lbs (680 kg) of explosive caused widespread damage to the centre of Newtownards, County Down. Seven people were injured.
 3 September – a  IRA van-bomb exploded outside Armagh Courthouse causing widespread damage in the centre of Armagh City.
2 October – 1993 Finchley Road bombings: Three IRA time bombs exploded on Finchley Road in north London.
15 October – two IRA bombs inflicted damage on the fortified courthouse at Cookstown, County Tyrone. Fifty people was evacuated to a nearby church hall.
23 October – Shankill Road bombing: eight civilians, one UDA member, and one IRA member were killed, and another IRA member was injured when an IRA bomb prematurely exploded at a fish shop on Shankill Road, Belfast.
24 October – Bombs exploded at Reading railway station (trackside and in a station toilet). A bomb was discovered at Basingstoke railway station and there were telephoned warnings of other devices planted at the Waterloo and Guildford railway stations.  The rail network was extensively disrupted.

1994
5 January – Two members of the Irish Army bomb disposal unit were injured when a parcel bomb sent by the UVF to the Sinn Féin offices in Dublin exploded during examination at the Cathal Brugha Barracks.
24 January – Incendiary devices that had been planted by the UFF were found at a school in Dundalk in County Louth and at a postal sorting office in Dublin.
9–13 March – Heathrow mortar attacks: On 9, 11, and 13 March, the IRA fired improvised mortar bombs on to the runway at Heathrow Airport. There were no deaths or injuries.
20 April – The Provisional IRA Derry Brigade fired a mortar bomb at a RUC landrover, killing one RUC officer and injuring two others.
14 May – the IRA detonated an explosive device next to a British Army sangar at a permanent vehicle checkpoint in Castleblaney Road, Keady, County Armagh. One British soldier was killed and another wounded.
29 July – More than 40 people were injured when the IRA fired three mortar bombs into the Newry RUC base. 30 civilians, seven RUC officers and three British soldiers were among those injured.
12 September – 1994 Dublin-Belfast train bombing: The UVF planted a bomb on the Belfast-Dublin train. At Connolly station, the bomb only partially exploded, slightly injuring two women.

1996
9 February – 1996 Docklands bombing: The bomb killed two civilians.
18 February – Aldwych bus bombing: Edward O'Brien, an IRA volunteer, died when an improvised explosive device he was carrying detonated prematurely on a number 171 bus in Aldwych, central London. The 2 kg semtex bomb detonated as he stood near the door of the bus. A pathologist found O'Brien was killed "virtually instantaneously", while other passengers and the driver (left permanently deaf) were injured in the explosion.
15 June – 1996 Manchester bombing: the IRA detonated a bomb in Manchester, England. It destroyed a large part of the city centre and injured over 200 people. To date, it is the largest bomb to be planted on the British mainland since World War II. Several buildings were damaged beyond repair and had to be demolished.
7 October – The IRA detonated two car bombs at the British Army headquarters in Thiepval Barracks, Lisburn. One soldier was killed and 31 injured.

1998
24 June – Newtownhamilton bombing: The INLA detonated a 200 lb car bomb in Newtownhamilton, injuring six people and causing substantial damage estimated at £2 million.
1 August – 1998 Banbridge bombing: A dissident republican group calling itself the Real Irish Republican Army (RIRA) detonated a bomb in Banbridge, County Down, injuring 35 people and causing extensive damage.
15 July – A package addressed to a Dublin hotel, which was believed to have been sent by the LVF, exploded while it was being examined at the Garda Technical Bureau in Dublin. Two were injured in the blast.
15 August – Omagh bombing: the RIRA detonated a bomb in Omagh, County Tyrone. It killed 29 civilians.

1999
15 March – Solicitor Rosemary Nelson, who had represented the Catholic and nationalist residents in the Drumcree conflict, was assassinated by a booby trapped car bomb in Lurgan, County Armagh. A loyalist group, Red Hand Defenders, claimed responsibility.

2001
4 March – 2001 BBC bombing: Television Centre, causing some damage to the building.
3 August – 2001 Ealing bombing: an RIRA car bomb injured seven civilians in Ealing, west London.

See also
Directory of the Northern Ireland Troubles
List of chronologies of Provisional Irish Republican Army actions
Timeline of the Northern Ireland Troubles
Timeline of Provisional Irish Republican Army actions
Timeline of Irish National Liberation Army actions
Timeline of Real Irish Republican Army actions
Timeline of Continuity Irish Republican Army actions
Timeline of Ulster Volunteer Force actions
Timeline of Ulster Defence Association actions
Timeline of Loyalist Volunteer Force actions
List of Irish police officers killed in the line of duty
Operation Banner

References

External links 
 

20th century in Northern Ireland
Explosions in the United Kingdom
Explosions in Northern Ireland
Explosions in Ireland
History timelines of Northern Ireland
The Troubles (Northern Ireland)
Bombings